Sallèles-d'Aude is a commune in the Aude department in southern France.  The Canal de Jonction, part of the La Nouvelle branch of the Canal du Midi, runs through the middle of the town.

Population

See also
Communes of the Aude department
Le Somail

References

External links

Official website

Communes of Aude
Aude communes articles needing translation from French Wikipedia